Ágatha Bednarczuk Rippel (born 22 June 1983), frequently referred to as just Ágatha, is a Brazilian international beach volleyball player, playing as a blocker. She won the gold medal at the 2015 World Championships, as well as a silver medal at the 2016 Summer Olympics, alongside her teammate Bárbara Seixas.

Biography
Born in Curitiba, Southern Brazil, to Maria José Vagnoni Moscardi and Alfredo Bednarczuk, a family of Polish and Italian ancestry, Agatha started competing in the city of Paranaguá. She became famous after competing at the 2005 Beach Volleyball World Championships. She was part of the Swatch FIVB World Tour 2008 and 2012. Bednarczuk also competed at the 2013 Beach Volleyball World Championships and was on the 2014 FIVB Beach Volleyball World Tour. She won the gold medal at the 2015 World Championships alongside her teammate Bárbara Seixas. This qualified her to represent Brazil at the 2016 Summer Olympics.

Professional career
Ágatha and her partner Bárbara beat Kerri Walsh-Jennings and April Ross of United States, in straight sets of (22–20), (21–18) in the 2016 Rio Olympic semifinal. The pair then lost to Germany's Laura Ludwig and Kira Walkenhorst.

References

External links

 
 
 
 
 
 Ágatha at Confederação Brasileira de Voleibol 

1983 births
Living people
Brazilian women's beach volleyball players
Beach volleyball blockers
Sportspeople from Curitiba
Medalists at the 2016 Summer Olympics
Olympic beach volleyball players of Brazil
Beach volleyball players at the 2016 Summer Olympics
Olympic silver medalists for Brazil
Olympic medalists in beach volleyball
Brazilian people of Polish descent
Brazilian people of Italian descent
Universiade medalists in beach volleyball
Universiade bronze medalists for Brazil
Medalists at the 2011 Summer Universiade
Beach volleyball players at the 2020 Summer Olympics
21st-century Brazilian women